The Warren Commercial Historic District is a historic commercial district located in Warren, Illinois. The district encompasses the town's central business district and includes 34 contributing buildings and a water tower. Development in the district began in 1852, the year that the Illinois Central Railroad came to Warren, and continued into the twentieth century. The railroad depot is a centerpiece of the district, as Warren's economy depended heavily on the railroad. Later development in the district mainly took place in the form of several distinct additions; as a result, lots in the district are irregularly sized. Most of the buildings in the district are vernacular brick commercial structures with pressed metal or brick ornamentation, though examples of Victorian and Classical Revival architecture can also be seen.

The district was added to the National Register of Historic Places on November 7, 1995.

References

Commercial buildings on the National Register of Historic Places in Illinois
Buildings and structures completed in 1852
National Register of Historic Places in Jo Daviess County, Illinois
1852 establishments in Illinois
Historic districts on the National Register of Historic Places in Illinois